The Independence Generation of Armenian writers is a group of writers whose literature was created after the independence of Armenia in 1991.

With the establishment of online literary magazine Granish, as well as the literary newmapaper Gretert a new generation of writers came into light.

References

Generation Independence: Armenia's Literary Superheroes
Editorial by Anahit Avetisyan and Mkrtich Matevossian at Transcript magazine of Literature Across Frontiers  
New Armenian Writing by Women by Nairi Hakhverdi at Words Without Borders

20th-century Armenian writers